Sam Francis Schreck (born 29 January 1999) is a German professional footballer who plays as a midfielder for  club Erzgebirge Aue.

Club career
Schreck made his professional debut for Bayer Leverkusen in the UEFA Europa League on 29 November 2018, starting against Bulgarian club Ludogorets Razgrad before coming off in the 73rd minute for Kai Havertz. The home match finished as a 1–1 draw.

On 6 August 2022, Schreck returned to Erzgebirge Aue on a permanent basis after playing for the club on loan in the previous season and signed a one-year contract with an option to extend.

International career
Schreck began his youth international career with Germany's under-16 team, first appearing on 12 September 2014 against Belgium. He was included in Germany's squad for the 2016 UEFA European Under-17 Championship in Azerbaijan. The team managed to reach the semi-finals, before losing 2–1 against Spain.

Career statistics

Club

Notes

References

External links
 
 
 
 

1999 births
Living people
People from Pinneberg
Footballers from Schleswig-Holstein
German footballers
Germany youth international footballers
Association football midfielders
Eredivisie players
2. Bundesliga players
3. Liga players
Bayer 04 Leverkusen players
FC Groningen players
FC Erzgebirge Aue players
German expatriate footballers
German expatriate sportspeople in the Netherlands
Expatriate footballers in the Netherlands